Penrith Building Society is a UK building society based in Penrith, Cumbria. It is a member of the Building Societies Association.

References

External links
Penrith Building Society
 Building Societies Association
 KPMG Building Societies Database 2008

Building societies of England
Banks established in 1877
Organizations established in 1877
Penrith, Cumbria
Organisations based in Cumbria
1877 establishments in England